Minervina was the first wife of Constantine the Great. She was of Syrian origin. Constantine either took her as a concubine or married her in 303, and the couple had one son, Crispus.

Life 
Constantine served as a hostage in the court of Eastern Roman Emperor Diocletian in Nicomedia, thus securing the loyalty of his father Constantius Chlorus, Caesar of the Western Roman Empire.

When Constantine wanted to strengthen his bonds with the other Tetrarchs, in 307 AD he set aside Minervina and married Fausta, daughter of Augustus Maximian. The marriage of Constantine to Fausta has caused modern historians to question the status of his relation to Minervina and Crispus. In the early 4th century, it was established at the Council of Nicaea (first ecumenical council, 325AD, after the legalization of Christianity by Constantine in 313AD- Edict of Milan, following his conversion) that a widow could marry again without being excluded from the congregation. Only widowers could marry again after the physical death of their spouse, although this was called "digamy". Canon 8 of the council of Nicaea speaks of it (those married twice were widow/ers). A divorce with a living spouse was not practised then in church, and no marriage with another (remarriage) was allowed, so long as both first spouses live (it is against the New Testament to marry again while the first spouse united in one flesh is living, Jesus calls it adultery), Constantine, therefore, could not divorce Minervina as a Christian. To divorce would have required an official written order signed by Constantine himself, but no such order is mentioned by contemporary sources. This silence in the sources has led many historians to conclude that the relationship between Constantine and Minervina was informal and to assume her to have been an unofficial lover. However, Minervina may have already been dead by 307. 

Neither the true nature of the relationship between Constantine and Minervina nor the reason Crispus came under the protection of his father will probably ever be known. The offspring of an illegitimate affair could have caused dynastical problems and would likely be dismissed, but Crispus was raised by his father in Gaul. This can be seen as evidence of a loving and public relationship between Constantine and Minervina, which gave him a reason to protect her son.

The story of Minervina is quite similar to that of Constantine's mother Helena. Constantine's father later had to divorce her for political reasons, specifically, to marry Flavia Maximiana Theodora, the daughter of Maximian, in order to secure his alliance with his new father-in-law. Constantine, in turn may have had to put aside Minervina in order to secure an alliance with the same man. Constantius did not dismiss Constantine as his son, and perhaps Constantine chose to follow his father's example.

Whatever the reason, Constantine kept Crispus at his side. Constantine even entrusted his education to Lactantius, among the most important Christian teachers of that time, who probably started teaching Crispus before 317. Crispus was sentenced to death by Constantine's order in 326.

See also 
 Christianization of the Roman Empire

Citations

References 
 Pohlsander, Hans, "Constantine I (306 – 337 A.D.)", De Imperatoribus Romanis site.

4th-century Roman empresses
Constantinian dynasty
Constantine the Great